Armed Nuclei for Popular Autonomy, also known as NAPAP, was a French Maoist armed organization formed in December 1976. According to the police, the leader of the NAPAP was Christian Harbulot. Members of the NAPAP influenced the Communist Combatant Cells in Belgium.

Members

 Frédéric Oriach
 Henri Savouillan
 Michel Lapeyre
 Jean-Paul Gérard

Bombings claimed by NAPAP
12 January 1976: assault of Paul Gardent, director general of Charbonnages de France (claimed by Vaincre et vivre).
23 March 1977: assassination of Jean-Antoine Tramoni, the murderer of Pierre Overney.
26 March 1977: attack on the Renault-Flins car park.
6 June 1977: attacks against the Usinor factory in Thionville and against Chrysler-France in Paris.
Summer 1977: series of anti-nuclear attacks with the help of anarchist militants from the Revolutionary Internationalist Action Groups.
8 October 1977: attack on the home of the Minister of Justice Alain Peyrefitte.
14 October 1977: attacks against the Palace of Justice and the Ministry of Justice in Paris.
21 October 1977: attack on Mercedes.
25 June 1978: on the night of 25 to 26, a 6kg bomb exploded at the Palace of Versailles. Claimed by NAPAP and then by the International Unemployment Group, it was in fact conducted by the Breton Liberation Front.
9 July 1980: attack against the German Railway Company.

See also
 Gauche prolétarienne
 Mao-Spontex

References

External links
 NAPAP - Qui sommesnous?

Autonomism
Defunct communist militant groups
Left-wing militant groups in France
Maoist organizations in France